Fluctuation may refer to:

Physics and mathematics
 Statistical fluctuations, in statistics, statistical mechanics, and thermodynamics
 Thermal fluctuations, statistical fluctuations in a thermodynamic variable
 Quantum fluctuation, arising from the uncertainty principle
 Primordial fluctuations, density variations in the early universe
 Universal conductance fluctuations, a quantum physics phenomenon encountered in electrical transport experiments in mesoscopic species

Finance and economics
 Economic conjuncture, a critical combination of events in economics
 Volatility (finance), price fluctuation